William Schreiber (born 10 February 1942) is a retired Romanian volleyball player. He was part of the Romanian national team that placed fifth at the 1972 Summer Olympics.

References

1942 births
Living people
Olympic volleyball players of Romania
Romanian men's volleyball players
Volleyball players at the 1972 Summer Olympics